The 2018 Engie Open Andrézieux-Bouthéon 42 was a professional tennis tournament played on indoor hard courts. It was the eighth edition of the tournament and was part of the 2018 ITF Women's Circuit. It took place in Andrézieux-Bouthéon, France, on 22–28 January 2018.

Singles main draw entrants

Seeds 

 1 Rankings as of 15 January 2018.

Other entrants 
The following players received a wildcard into the singles main draw:
  Sara Cakarevic
  Fiona Ferro
  Chloé Paquet
  Pauline Parmentier

The following players received entry from the qualifying draw:
  Audrey Albié
  Manon Arcangioli
  Cristina Bucșa
  Harmony Tan

Champions

Singles

 Georgina García Pérez def.  Arantxa Rus, 6–2, 6–0

Doubles
 
 Ysaline Bonaventure /  Bibiane Schoofs def.  Camilla Rosatello /  Kimberley Zimmermann, 4–6, 7–5, [10–7]

External links 
 Official website
 2018 Engie Open Andrézieux-Bouthéon 42 at ITFtennis.com

2018 ITF Women's Circuit
2018 in French tennis
Open Andrézieux-Bouthéon 42